HMS Alaric (P441), was an Amphion-class submarine of the Royal Navy, built by Cammell Laird laid down in May 1944 and launched 18 February 1946.

Design
Like all Amphion-class submarines, Alaric had a displacement of  when at the surface and  while submerged. The submarine was powered by two Admiralty ML eight-cylinder diesel engines generating a power of  each. It also contained four electric motors each producing  that drove two shafts.

Alaric was fitted with ten  torpedo tubes, one QF 4 inch naval gun Mk XXIII, one Oerlikon 20 mm cannon, and a .303 British Vickers machine gun. Its torpedo tubes were fitted to the bow and stern, and it could carry twenty torpedoes. Its complement was sixty-one crew members.

Service
Alaric served on the home station all her life and was modernised in the 1960s.  In 1953 she took part in the Fleet Review to celebrate the Coronation of Queen Elizabeth II. In 1968 she was part of the First Submarine Squadron based at HMS Dolphin and took part in Navy Days at Portsmouth during that year. Following decommissioning, Alaric was sold to Thos. W. Ward for scrapping at Inverkeithing, arriving there in July 1971.

References

Publications

External links
 Pictures of HMS Alaric at MaritimeQuest

 

Amphion-class submarines
Cold War submarines of the United Kingdom
Ships built on the River Mersey
1946 ships